SS Nyanza is a disused passenger-cargo steamer on Lake Victoria in East Africa. She is one of seven Clyde-built ships called Nyanza that were launched between 1867 and 1956.

History

Bow, McLachlan and Company of Paisley in Renfrewshire, Scotland built SS Nyanza in 1907 for the Uganda Railway. She was a "knock-down" vessel; that is, she was constructed in the normal fashion at the shipyard in Paisley, then, after all her parts had been marked with identifying numbers, disassembled and transported by sea in kit form to Kenya for reassembly and fit-out.

Ownership of Nyanza passed from the Uganda Railway to its successors Kenya and Uganda Railways and Harbours in 1929 and the East African Railways and Harbours Corporation in 1948. In 2002 she was owned by a private company, Delship Ltd, that planned to convert her into a motor vessel. As of 2019, Nyanza was still laid up at Kisumu, along with fleetmate .

SS Nomadic
In 2008 the Nomadic Preservation Society launched an unsuccessful appeal for £200,000 to buy Nyanzas engines and boilers, ship them to the United Kingdom and install them in Nomadic. As of 2019, the engines and boilers are still intact and inside Nyanza.

See also
 Lake Victoria ferries

References

External links
 — photos of various former EAR&H ships lying derelict at Kisumu, including SS Nyanza and 

1907 ships
Ships built on the River Clyde
Lake Victoria